Infrastructure for Peace is a new approach in peacebuilding which gained momentum after locally led and participatory peacebuilding practices tended to yield effective results in some countries beset by conflicts. It underpins the ideas of conflict transformation and stresses on under-girding the politically negotiated settlements at top level by peacebuilding efforts at the grassroots.

Definition
In 2010, governments, political parties, civil society and United Nations country representatives from 14 African countries in Kenya agreed upon a working definition of infrastructures for peace as a ‘dynamic network of interdependent structures, mechanisms, resources, values and skills which, through dialogue and consultation, contribute to conflict prevention and peacebuilding in a society’.

Examples
Studies exemplify National Peace Council (Ghana), Department on Ethnic, Religious Policy and Civil Society Interaction (Kyrgyzstan) and economical approaches in Guyana, Bolivia and Kenya and the United Nations Development Programme contributes to about 30 infrastructures for peace projects around the globe.

Criticisms
Critical studies on the infrastructure for peace mainly see this as a fuzzy concept because peacebuilding cannot be guaranteed only by local efforts. Such local infrastructures are prone to suffer from political upheavals, they still rely on external funding and cannot do well under strictly autocratic regimes. New research works, which conflate infrastructures for peace with security sector reform have also suggested such architectures need to rise above local boundaries to negotiate on security issues because (in)security has transnational connections.

Contributions
Academic conferences, special editions of journals, issue-specific books and websites dedicated to this topic have begun to emerge including the UNE Peace Studies Conference (2015) on questioning 'peace formation' and 'peace infrastructure' , I4P International website , Berghof Handbook and a Journal of Peacebuilding and Development Special Edition in Vol. 7, No. 3.

References

Peacebuilding
Political theories
Peace and conflict studies